Choosing Scotland's Future was a consultation document published on 14 August 2007, by the Scottish Government.

As a tagline, it quoted Charles Stewart Parnell:

See also
National Conversation
Scottish referendum bill 2010

References

External links
Choosing Scotland's Future, Scottish Government website
National Conversation, Scottish Government website

2007 in politics
2007 in Scotland
2007 documents
Political history of Scotland
Scottish Government
White papers
Scottish National Party
Public consultations